The Fort is a government building located at the intersection of Ash and Lincoln Sts. in Taft, California. The building is a replica of Sutter's Fort in Sacramento. The Fort was built by the Works Progress Administration from 1938 to 1940 and was one of the largest WPA buildings constructed in the San Joaquin Valley. The buildings at The Fort have been used for government offices at the federal, state, and local levels.

The Fort was added to the National Register of Historic Places on July 22, 1981.

See also
California Historical Landmarks in Kern County, California
National Register of Historic Places listings in Kern County, California

References

External links

Buildings and structures in Kern County, California
Government buildings completed in 1940
Government buildings on the National Register of Historic Places in California
National Register of Historic Places in Kern County, California
Works Progress Administration in California